Jabal al-Kana'is is a mountain in the Hama Governorate in Syria. It has an elevation of 1,259 meters, making it the highest mountain in the Hama Governorate and the 165th highest in Syria.

References

Mountains of Hama Governorate